Electoral district no. 3 is one of the 12 multi-member electoral districts of the Riigikogu, the national legislature of Estonia. The electoral district was established in 1995 following the re-organisation of the electoral districts in Tallinn. It is conterminous with the districts of Mustamäe and Nõmme in Tallinn. The district currently elects eight of the 101 members of the Riigikogu using the open party-list proportional representation electoral system. At the 2019 parliamentary election it had 71,882 registered electors.

Electoral system
Electoral district no. 3 currently elects eight of the 101 members of the Riigikogu using the open party-list proportional representation electoral system. The allocation of seats is carried out in three stages. In the first stage, any individual candidate, regardless of whether they are a party or independent candidate, who receives more votes than the district's simple quota (Hare quota: valid votes in district/number of seats allocated to district) is elected via a personal mandate. In the second stage, district mandates are allocated to parties by dividing their district votes by the district's simple quota. Only parties that reach the 5% national threshold compete for district mandates and any personal mandates won by the party are subtracted from the party's district mandates. Prior to 2003 if a party's surplus/remainder votes was equal to or greater than 75% of the district's simple quota it received one additional district mandate. Any unallocated district seats are added to a national pool of compensatory seats. In the final stage, compensatory mandates are calculated based on the national vote and using a modified D'Hondt method. Only parties that reach the 5% national threshold compete for compensatory seats and any personal and district mandates won by the party are subtracted from the party's compensatory mandates. Though calculated nationally, compensatory mandates are allocated at the district level.

Seats
Seats allocated to electoral district no. 3 by the National Electoral Committee of Estonia at each election was as follows:
 2023 - 8
 2019 - 8
 2015 - 8
 2011 - 8
 2007 - 8
 2003 - 8
 1999 - 8
 1995 - 8

Election results

Summary

(Excludes compensatory seats)

Detailed

2023
Results of the 2023 parliamentary election held on 5 March 2023:

The following candidates were elected:
 Personal mandates - Urmas Paet (REF), 9,154 votes.
 District mandates - Martin Helme (EKRE), 4,606 votes; Lauri Laats (KESK), 5,984 votes; Maris Lauri (REF), 4,085 votes; and Vilja Toomast (REF), 2,633 votes; and Margus Tsahkna (EE200), 2,922 votes.
 Compensatory mandates - Riina Siikut (SDE), 2,531 votes.

2019
Results of the 2019 parliamentary election held on 3 March 2019:

The following candidates were elected:
 Personal mandates - Urmas Paet (RE), 8,584 votes.
 District mandates - Taavi Aas (K), 3,925 votes; Martin Helme (EKRE), 5,967 votes; Lauri Laats (K), 3,251 votes; Maris Lauri (RE), 4,331 votes; and Urmas Reinsalu (I), 2,633 votes.
 Compensatory mandates - Johannes Kert (RE), 708 votes; and Vilja Toomast (RE), 953 votes.

2015
Results of the 2015 parliamentary election held on 1 March 2015:

The following candidates were elected:
 Personal mandates - Urmas Paet (RE), 7,868 votes.
 District mandates - Maris Lauri (RE), 4,019 votes; Ain Lutsepp (EVA), 4,109 votes; Rein Ratas (K), 3,449 votes; Urmas Reinsalu (IRL), 2,949 votes; Erki Savisaar (K), 1,826 votes; and Rainer Vakra (SDE), 4,132 votes.
 Compensatory mandates - Martin Helme (EKRE), 4,296 votes; and Martin Kukk (RE), 456 votes.

2011
Results of the 2011 parliamentary election held on 6 March 2011:

The following candidates were elected:
 Personal mandates - Urmas Paet (RE), 10,779 votes; and Jüri Ratas (K), 7,620 votes.
 District mandates - Peeter Kreitzberg (SDE), 3,144 votes; Urmas Reinsalu (IRL), 5,055 votes; Aivar Sõerd (RE), 1,615 votes; and Rainer Vakra (K), 1,259 votes.
 Compensatory mandates - Siim Valmar Kiisler (IRL), 1,388 votes.

2007
Results of the 2007 parliamentary election held on 4 March 2007:

The following candidates were elected:
 Personal mandates - Urmas Paet (RE), 8,685 votes.
 District mandates - Enn Eesmaa (K), 1,420 votes; Peeter Kreitzberg (SDE), 3,606 votes; Maret Maripuu (RE), 3,298 votes; Juhan Parts (IRL), 2,975 votes; and Jüri Ratas (K), 6,109 votes.
 Compensatory mandates - Helle Kalda (K), 838 votes; Mart Nutt (IRL), 887 votes; Urmas Reinsalu (IRL), 1,888 votes; Paul-Eerik Rummo (RE), 916 votes; and Erika Salumäe (ERL), 576 votes.

2003
Results of the 2003 parliamentary election held on 2 March 2003:

The following candidates were elected:
 Personal mandates - Urmas Paet (RE), 7,560 votes.
 District mandates - Olav Aarna (ÜVE-RP), 4,470 votes; Enn Eesmaa (K), 3,295 votes; Maret Maripuu (RE), 2,236 votes; Siiri Oviir (K), 2,631 votes; and Urmas Reinsalu (ÜVE-RP), 2,754 votes.
 Compensatory mandates - Mart Opmann (ERL), 396 votes.

1999
Results of the 1999 parliamentary election held on 7 March 1999:

The following candidates were elected:
 Personal mandates - Siim Kallas (RE), 7,465 votes.
 District mandates - Mart Meri (M), 2,600 votes; Liina Tõnisson (K), 2,241 votes; and Lauri Vahtre (I), 4,495 votes.
 Compensatory mandates - Tiit Käbin (RE), 1,215 votes; Mari-Ann Kelam (I), 1,842 votes; Värner Lootsmann (K), 293 votes; Maret Maripuu (RE), 553 votes; Ülo Nugis (KE), 800 votes; Ülo Tärno (K), 166 votes; and Jevgeni Tomberg (EÜRP), 1,101 votes.

1995
Results of the 1995 parliamentary election held on 5 March 1995:

The following candidates were elected:
 Personal mandates - Tiit Käbin (RE), 9,812 votes; and Endel Lippmaa (KMÜ), 7,540 votes.
 District mandates - Endel Eero (KMÜ), 3,241 votes; and Liina Tõnisson (K), 3,892 votes.
 Compensatory mandates - Jaanus Betlem (I\ERSP), 319 votes; Tunne Kelam (I\ERSP), 4,335 votes; Kalev Kukk (RE), 531 votes; Peeter Lorents (KMÜ), 149 votes; Talvi Märja (KMÜ), 207 votes; and Mart Ummelas (K), 805 votes.

Notes

References

03
03
Riigikogu electoral district, 3